International Day of Argania holds on every May 10 celebrate and promote the heritage of the Argania tree.

Background 
The Argania tree holds is significant in Moroccan culture and heritage. Morocco is the main international exporter of Argan-based products which is used to  produce popular ingredient in cosmetics, skincare, and hair care products.

In 1988, the United Nations Educational Scientific and Cultural Organization designated the production area for the Arganeraie Biosphere Reserve. The argan tree was a subject of the UNESCO Representative List of the Intangible Cultural Heritage of Humanity in 2014.

March 3, 2021, the United Nations General Assembly declared 10 May the International Day of Argania and the 113 member states of the United Nations adopted it by consensus.

References 

World forestry
UNESCO
United Nations General Assembly resolutions
May observances
Forestry events
2021 in the United Nations
United Nations days